Zatrić (Serbian Cyrillic:) is a village in municipality of Orahovac in Kosovo. Old name of the village was Zatrič. Above the village are the remains of fortress Zatrič. The village has Albanian ethnic majority.

Notes

References 

Villages in Orahovac